Konetsgorye is a rural locality (a village) in Osinovskoye Rural Settlement of Vinogradovsky District, Arkhangelsk Oblast, Russia. The population was 115 as of 2010.

Geography 
Konetsgorye is located 31 km southeast of Bereznik (the district's administrative centre) by road. Artyushinskaya is the nearest rural locality.

References 

Rural localities in Vinogradovsky District